Renato Perona (14 November 1927 – 9 April 1984) was an Italian racing cyclist and Olympic champion in track cycling.

He won a gold medal in the tandem event (with Ferdinando Terruzzi) at the 1948 Summer Olympics in London.

References

1927 births
1984 deaths
People from Terni
Italian male cyclists
Olympic gold medalists for Italy
Cyclists at the 1948 Summer Olympics
Olympic cyclists of Italy
Italian track cyclists
Olympic medalists in cycling
Sportspeople from the Province of Terni
Medalists at the 1948 Summer Olympics
Cyclists from Umbria
20th-century Italian people